Novotroyevka is a rural locality (a village) in Shemyaksky Selsoviet, Ufimsky District, Bashkortostan, Russia. The population was 236 as of 2010. There are 2 streets.

Geography 
Novotroyevka is located 50 km west of Ufa (the district's administrative centre) by road. Krasny Oktyabr is the nearest rural locality.

References 

Rural localities in Ufimsky District